Tony Tang is a Hong Kong-born Canadian engineer and city councillor. He was elected as part of the Vision Vancouver slate in 2011. He was defeated in his bid for re-election in the November 15, 2014 civic election, placing 16th in the race for 10 council positions with 49,414 votes.

Life and career
A native of Hong Kong, Tang immigrated to Canada in 1969 and worked in the home construction sector for more than 22 years. He holds a master's degree in engineering from the University of British Columbia, and studied art through the Alberta College of Art. An engineer by profession, he is able to speak Cantonese and Mandarin fluently and was a board member of the Shaughnessy Heights Property Owners' Association for five years between 2001 and 2006. He was the chair of the Vancouver board of variance. In September 2009 he was accused by Ray Tomlin, a member of the Vancouver Board of Variance who subsequently fired after the making the allegation, of violating the Vancouver Charter by holding meetings in private.

Board memberships
 Hastings Institute Board
 Vancouver City Planning Commission
 Seniors Advisory Committee
 Gastown Historic Area Planning Committee

References

Living people
Canadian engineers
Hong Kong emigrants to Canada
Naturalized citizens of Canada
University of British Columbia Faculty of Applied Science alumni
Vision Vancouver councillors
Year of birth missing (living people)